Filago pyramidata, the broadleaf cottonrose  or broad-leaved cudweed, is a European plant species in the sunflower family. It is native to the Mediterranean region of southern Europe, northern Africa, and the Middle East, plus Great Britain, the Low Countries, and Germany. It is also naturalized in scattered locations in North America (British Columbia, Oregon, California) and Australia (South Australia, Victoria), Pakistan, and other places.

It produces flower heads in dense clumps of 8-16 heads, each containing several small flowers.

References

External links
line drawing from Flora of Pakistan: Asteraceae II, Vol. 210, (Fig. 31, A-E) 
Cretan Flora
Online Atlas of the British & Irish flora
Online Flora of Malta
Flowers of India
Plant Biodiversity of South-Western Morocco

Gnaphalieae
Flora of Europe
Plants described in 1753
Taxa named by Carl Linnaeus